Aspergillus endophyticus is a species of fungus in the genus Aspergillus, section Aspergillus. It was isolated as an endophyte of Acer pseudoplatanus in the Czech Republic.

The identified extrolites produced by A. endophyticus include auroglaucin, bisanthrones, dihydroauroglaucin, echinulins, emodin, erythroglaucin, flavoglaucin, isoechinulins, neoechinulins, physcion, and tetrahydroauroglaucin.

Growth and morphology 

A. endophyticus has been cultivated on both yeast extract sucrose agar (YES) plates and Malt Extract Agar Oxoid® (MEAOX) plates. The growth morphology of the colonies can be seen in the pictures below.

References 

endophyticus
Fungi described in 2017